Rana pseudodalmatina is a species of frog in the family Ranidae endemic to Iran.

Its natural habitats are temperate forests, temperate grassland, and rivers.

Sources

Endemic fauna of Iran
Rana (genus)
Taxonomy articles created by Polbot
Amphibians described in 1971